The island fox (Urocyon littoralis) is a small fox that is endemic to six of the eight Channel Islands of California. There are six subspecies, each unique to the island it lives on, reflecting its evolutionary history. They are generally docile, show little fear of humans, and are easily tamed. Island foxes played an important role in the spiritual lives of native Channel Islanders. They have been likely semi-domesticated as pets, used as pelts, or for other functions, like pest control.

Taxonomy and evolution

The island fox shares the genus Urocyon with the mainland gray fox (U. cinereoargenteus), the species from which it is descended. Its small size is a result of insular dwarfism, a form of allopatric speciation. Because the island fox is geographically isolated, it has not acquired immunity to parasites and diseases brought in from the mainland and is especially vulnerable to those that the domestic dog may carry. In addition, predation by the golden eagle (Aquila chrysaetos) and human activities devastated fox numbers on several of the Channel Islands in the 1990s. Four island fox subspecies were federally protected as an endangered species in 2004, and efforts to rebuild fox populations and restore the ecosystems of the Channel Islands are being undertaken. Radio collars are being attached to foxes in an effort to track and locate the young foxes. To date these efforts have been largely successful.

There are six subspecies of the island fox, each of which is native to a specific Channel Island, and which evolved there independently of the others. The subspecies are:
 U. l. littoralis (the nominate subspecies) of San Miguel Island,
 U. l. dickeyi of San Nicolas Island,
 U. l. catalinae of Santa Catalina Island,
 U. l. clementae of San Clemente Island,
 U. l. santacruzae of Santa Cruz Island, and
 U. l. santarosae of Santa Rosa Island.

Foxes from each island are capable of interbreeding, but have genetic and phenotypic distinctions that make them unique; for example, each subspecies has differing numbers of tail vertebrae.

The small size of the island fox is an adaptation to the limited resources available in the island environment, or island dwarfism. The foxes are believed to have "rafted" to the northern islands between 10,400 and 16,000 years ago. Initially, fox populations were located on the three northern islands, which were likely easier to access during the last ice age — when lowered sea levels united four of the northernmost islands into a single mega-island (Santa Rosae) and the distance between the islands and the mainland was reduced — it is likely that Native Americans brought the foxes to the southern islands of the archipelago, perhaps as pets, or hunting dogs.

Other names for the island fox include coast fox, short-tailed fox, island gray fox, Channel Islands fox, Channel Islands gray fox, California Channel Islands fox and insular gray fox.

Description
The island fox is significantly smaller than the related gray fox, and is the smallest fox in North America, averaging slightly smaller than the swift (Vulpes velox) and kit foxes (Vulpes macrotis). This is due to the fact that the island fox generally has two fewer tail vertebrae than the gray fox. The male is always larger than the female. The largest of the subspecies occurs on Santa Catalina Island and the smallest on Santa Cruz Island.

The island fox has gray fur on its head, a ruddy red coloring on its sides, white fur on its belly, throat and the lower half of its face, and a black stripe on the dorsal surface of its tail. In general the coat is darker and duller hued than that of the gray fox. The island fox molts once a year between August and November. Before the first molt pups are woolly and have a generally darker coat than adult foxes. A brown phase, with the grey and black fur of the body replaced by a sandy brown and a deeper brown, may occur in the San Clemente Island and San Nicolas Island populations. It is unclear if this is a true color phase, a change that occurs with age, or possibly a change that occurs because of interactions with Opuntia cactus spines that become embedded in the pelt.

Reproduction
The island fox typically forms monogamous breeding pairs, which are frequently seen together beginning in January and through the breeding season, from late February to early March. The gestation period is 50–63 days. The female island fox gives birth in a den, a typical litter having one to five pups, with an average of two or three. Pups are born in the spring and emerge from the den in early summer; the mother lactates for 7–9 weeks. Sexual maturity is reached at 10 months, and the females usually breed within the first year. Island foxes live for 4–6 years in the wild and for up to 8 years in captivity.

Ecology and behavior

Its preferred habitat is complex layer vegetation with a high density of woody, perennially fruiting shrubs. The fox lives in all of the island biomes including temperate forest, temperate grassland and chaparral, with no island supporting more than 1,000 foxes. The island fox eats fruits, insects, birds, eggs, land snails, crabs, lizards, amphibians, and small mammals, including deer mice, as well as human refuse. In addition, they are known to scavenge for food on beaches along the coastline. The fox tends to move around by itself, rather than in packs. It is generally nocturnal, although with peaks of activity at dawn and dusk. Activity also fluctuates with the season: It is more active during the day in summer than it is in winter.

The island fox is not intimidated by humans, although at first may show aggression. It is quite easy to tame and is generally docile. The island fox communicates using auditory, olfactory and visual signals. A dominant fox uses vocalizations, staring, and ear flattening to cause another fox to submit. Signs of dominance and submission are visual, such as facial expression and body posture. Its main vocalizations are barking and growling. The island fox marks territory with urine and feces.

Conservation status and federal protection

In March 2004, four subspecies of the island fox were classified as a federally protected endangered species: the Santa Cruz island fox, Santa Rosa island fox, San Miguel island fox and the Santa Catalina island fox. As of 2013, the IUCN lists the entire species as near threatened, an improvement from its previous status of "critically endangered". A decline in island fox populations was identified in the 1990s. On San Miguel Island, the decline began in 1994, with the population falling from 450 adults to 15 by 1999. Similar population declines were discovered on Santa Cruz Island. On the Santa Cruz Island the population decreased from 2,000 adults in 1994 to less than 135 in 2000, and on Santa Rosa Island where foxes may have numbered more than 1,500 in 1994, but were reduced to 14 animals by 2000. In 2004, there were 38 San Miguel island foxes, all in captivity; 46 foxes in captivity on Santa Rosa Island and seven in the wild (golden eagle predation prevented the release of captive foxes into the wild); Santa Cruz Island had 25 captive foxes and a stable wild population of around 100 foxes.

Golden eagle predation, discovered when foxes were radio-collared and monitored, proved to be the cause of the high mortality rates. The golden eagle was an uncommon visitor to the Channel Islands before the 1990s according to data gathered by Dr. Lyndal Laughrin of the University of California Santa Cruz Island Reserve, and the first golden eagle nest was recorded on Santa Cruz Island in 1999. Biologists propose that the eagle may have been attracted to the islands in the 1960s after the decline of the bald eagle. The golden eagle replaced the bald eagle and began to feed on feral pigs following the devastation of the local bald eagle population due to DDT exposure in the 1950s—the bald eagle would have deterred the golden eagle from settling on the islands while it subsisted on fish.

The feral pigs on Santa Rosa were exterminated by the National Park Service in the early 1990s, which removed one of the golden eagle's food sources. The golden eagle then began to prey on the island fox population. Feral pigs on Santa Cruz Island and deer and elk on Santa Rosa Island were introduced almost 70 years prior to island fox decline, therefore, the golden eagle most likely did not seek these animals as alternative prey. This has occurred most likely as a result of a process known as apparent competition: in this process, a predator, like the golden eagle, feeds on at least two prey, for example, the island fox and feral pigs. One prey item is adapted to high predation pressure and supports the predator population (i.e. pigs), whereas the other prey item (i.e. the island fox) is poorly adapted to predation and declines as a consequence of the predation pressure. It has also been proposed that the complete removal of golden eagles may be the only action that could save three subspecies of the island fox from extinction. However, the pigs on Santa Cruz Island were killed by the Nature Conservancy on the idea that they drew the eagles to the foxes.

Introduced diseases or parasites can devastate island fox populations. Because the island fox is isolated, it has not acquired immunity to parasites and diseases brought in from the mainland and is especially vulnerable to those the domestic dog may carry. A canine distemper outbreak in 1998 killed approximately 90% of Santa Catalina Island's foxes, reducing the population from 1,300 to 103 in 2000. A vaccination program has been initiated to protect Catalina Island foxes from canine distemper. After several years of carefully trapping the foxes and vaccinating them against distemper and rabies, their population has surpassed the pre-disease population of about 1,300. Scientists believe the distemper virus was introduced by a pet dog or a raccoon from the mainland that hitched a ride on a boat or a barge. To eliminate the risk of disease, pets are not permitted in Channel Islands National Park.

Diminished food supply and general degradation of the habitat due to introduced mammal species, including feral cats, pigs, sheep, goats, and American bison, the last having been introduced to Catalina Island in the 1920s by a Hollywood film crew shooting a Western, also has had a negative effect on fox populations.

The foxes threaten a population of the severely endangered San Clemente Island loggerhead shrike in residence on San Clemente Island. The island fox population has been negatively affected by trapping and removal or euthanasia of foxes by the United States Navy. Since 2000, the Navy has employed different management strategies: trapping and holding foxes during the shrike breeding season, the installation of an electric fence system around shrike habitats, and the use of shock collar systems. With the gradual recovery of the shrike population on San Clemente Island, the Navy no longer controls the foxes.

The populations of Santa Cruz island foxes, San Miguel island foxes, and Santa Rosa island foxes have dramatically rebounded from lows in 2000 of 70 for the Santa Cruz foxes and 15 each on San Miguel and Santa Rosa Islands. The Catalina Island Conservancy runs a captive breeding program on Catalina Island. On September 14, 2012, the US Fish and Wildlife Service released a draft recovery plan for the San Miguel island fox, Santa Rosa island fox, Santa Cruz island fox, and the Santa Catalina island fox. By 2012, the Catalina Island Conservancy determined that there were 1,500 Santa Catalina island foxes and the population was stable.   Since then the fox populations have grown.

 

Because the Channel Islands are almost entirely owned and controlled by either the Catalina Island Conservancy, The Nature Conservancy, or the federal government, the fox has a chance to receive the protection it needs, including constant supervision by interested officials without the ongoing threat of human encroachment on its habitat.

The fox did not persist on Anacapa Island because it has no reliable source of fresh water; Santa Barbara Island is too small to support the food needs of a viable fox population.

Rene Vellanoweth, an archaeologist, believes that inbreeding depression can be managed by mixing the different island fox subspecies populations much as the indigenous peoples did, by moving them from island to island, creating a higher genetic diversity and assisting them in recovery.

See also
Darwin's fox
Falkland Islands wolf

References

External links

 Catalina Island Conservancy

Carnivorans of North America
Endemic fauna of California
Fauna of the California chaparral and woodlands
Fauna of the Channel Islands of California
Foxes
Mammals described in 1857
Mammals of the United States
Taxa named by Spencer Fullerton Baird